HMS Byard was a  of the Royal Navy during World War II. She was named for Sir Thomas Byard, who commanded  at the Battle of Camperdown in 1797 during the French Revolutionary Wars.

Originally destined for the US Navy as a turbo-electric (TE) type  destroyer escort, HMS Byard was provisionally given the name USS Donaldson (this name was reassigned to DE 44).  However the ship was diverted to the Royal Navy before her launch.

Actions

HMS Byard served exclusively with the 4th Escort Group earning battle honours for service in the North Atlantic.

In 1943, HMS Byards ship's company paraded in Boston, MA, in the American Day parade.

On 17 October 1943, HMS Byard was escorting Atlantic convoy ONS 20 which was attacked by a wolf pack of 16 U-boats east of Cape Farewell, Greenland. During the ensuing battle HMS Byard sank the submarine  at position , by the use of depth charges resulting in 27 dead and 27 survivors from U-841s crew. This action made HMS Byard the first Captain-class frigate to destroy a Kriegsmarine submarine.

General information

Pennant (UK): K 315
Pennant (US): DE 55

References
 The Captain Class Frigates in the Second World War by Donald Collingwood. published by Leo Cooper (1998), .
 The Buckley-Class Destroyer Escorts by Bruce Hampton Franklin, published by Chatham Publishing (1999), .
 German U-Boat Losses During World War II by Axel Niestle, published by United States Naval Inst (1998), .

External links
 U-boat.net page for HMS Byard
 U-boat.net page for U-841
 captainclassfrigates.co.uk

Captain-class frigates
Buckley-class destroyer escorts
World War II frigates of the United Kingdom
1943 ships